The American Dream is a 2022 Indian Telugu-language drama thriller film written and directed by Dr. Vighnesh Koushik. Produced by Dr. Pradeep Reddy, the film features Prince Cecil and Neha Krishna in lead roles. The film premiered on 14 January 2022 on the streaming service Aha.

Plot

Cast 

 Prince Cecil as Rahul Dharanikota
 Neha Krishna as Riya Varma
 Subhalekha Sudhakar as Rahul's father 
 Raviteja Mukkavalli
 Sri Mirajkar
 Phani Rampalli
 Anil Sankaramanch,
 Sri Ram Reddy 
 Asireddy
 Muralidhar
 Ravi Kumar Marka
 Jed Brian

Soundtrack

Reception 
Thadhagath Pathi of The Times of India gave rating of 3 out of 5 and wrote that "The only gripe one can find with American Dream is that it is much darker than what it seems. But if one is ready for it, the film won't disappoint". 123Telugu wrote in their review that, "The narrative is uneven for most parts. The director Koushik pens a simple yet effective storyline. The end portion is handled well, but the opening exchanges are bland and the pace of the proceedings keeps dropping every now and again". Another reviewer opined that the film makes an okay watch as the backdrop of the US and relatable situations connect with the audiences.

References

External links 

 
 The American Dream on Aha

2020s Telugu-language films
2022 crime thriller films
2022 direct-to-video films
2022 films
Aha (streaming service) original films
Films set in Hyderabad, India
Films set in the United States
Films shot in Hyderabad, India
Films shot in the United States
Indian crime thriller films
Indian direct-to-video films